Miss Venezuela 1976 was the 23rd edition of Miss Venezuela pageant held at Teatro Paris (now called Teatro La Campiña) in Caracas, Venezuela, on May 21, 1976. The winner of the pageant was Elluz Peraza, Miss Guárico.

The pageant was broadcast live by Venevision.

On May 23, Peraza resigned after 36 hours of her reign, and Judith Castillo, Miss Nueva Esparta was crowned as Miss Venezuela 1976.

Results
Miss Venezuela 1976 - Elluz Peraza (Miss Guárico) (resigned)
1st runner-up - Judith Castillo (Miss Nueva Esparta) (crowned Miss Venezuela 1976 on May 24, 1976)
2nd runner-up - Maria Genoveva Rivero (Miss Lara)
3rd runner-up - Betzabeth Ayala (Miss Miranda)
4th runner-up - Ana Flor Raucci (Miss Bolívar)

Special awards
 Miss Fotogénica (Miss Photogenic) - Elluz Peraza (Miss Guárico)
 Miss Simpatía (Miss Congeniality) - Zoritza Ljubisavljević (Miss Mérida)
 Miss Amistad (Miss Friendship) - Judith Castillo (Miss Nueva Esparta)

Delegates

 Miss Anzoátegui - Herminia Carrasco
 Miss Aragua - Carolina Kumerow
 Miss Barinas - Migdalia Rivero
 Miss Bolívar - Ana Flor Raucci
 Miss Carabobo - Maria Estela Paz
 Miss Departamento Vargas - Jenny Goteinheins Orihuela
 Miss Distrito Federal - Sonia Margarita De Chene
 Miss Guárico - Elluz Peraza González
 Miss Lara - Maria Genoveva Rivero Giménez
 Miss Mérida - Zoritza Ljubisavljević
 Miss Miranda - Betzabeth Ayala
 Miss Nueva Esparta - Judith Castillo Uribe
 Miss Táchira - Maria Cecilia Castillo
 Miss Trujillo - Sonia Santamaría
 Miss Zulia - Leida Adrianza

External links
Miss Venezuela official website

1976 beauty pageants
1976 in Venezuela